Rideau-Rockcliffe Ward is a city ward in Ottawa, Ontario. Located in the city's east end, the ward covers the neighbourhoods of New Edinburgh, Manor Park, Rockcliffe Park, Wateridge Village, Overbrook, Lindenlea, Viscount Alexander Park, Carson Meadows, Cardinal Glen, Rockcliffe Mews, Forbes, Castle Heights and part of Carson Grove.

Prior to amalgamation, the area was part of Rideau Ward. The name "Rideau Ward" has been applied to this area since New Edinburgh was annexed by Ottawa in 1887. It was first contested in the 1887 municipal election, and was known as New Edinburgh Ward in the 1887 and 1888 elections. This recent incarnation of Rideau Ward was created in 1994 from Overbrook-Forbes Ward and part of By-Rideau Ward.

Councillors

School trustees
Ottawa-Carleton District School Board: Lyra Evans (Zone 6, with Rideau-Vanier Ward)
Ottawa Catholic School Board: Thérèse Maloney Cousineau  (Zone 10, with Somerset Ward and Rideau-Vanier Ward)
Conseil des écoles publiques de l'Est de l'Ontario: Marielle Godbout (Zone 9, with Alta Vista Ward)
Conseil des écoles catholiques du Centre-Est: Denis Poirier (Zone 11, with Beacon Hill-Cyrville Ward)

Election results

1994 elections

1997 elections

2000 Ottawa municipal election

2003 Ottawa municipal election

2006 Ottawa municipal election

2010 Ottawa municipal election

2014 Ottawa municipal election

2018 Ottawa municipal election

2019 by-election
There was a by-election on April 15, 2019 to replace Nussbaum, who was appointed as the CEO for the National Capital Commission.

Candidates
Kasia Adamiec - Worked at the federal and municipal level of politics, founding member of the Ottawa Police Youth Advisory Committee Endorsed by Former Conservative MP Ted Opitz.
Idris Ben-Tahir
Marc Dorgeville - Financial counsellor and former climate science researcher. 
Bruce A. Faulkner
Johan Hamels - Green Party of Canada International liaison
Peter Heyck - Ran in this ward in 2018
Miklos Horvath
Peter Jan Karwacki
Rawlson King - President of the Overbrook community association. Endorsed by city councillors Catherine McKenney and Shawn Menard, NDP MPP Joel Harden, OCDSB School Trustees Lyra Evans and Chris Ellis, and former city councillor Clive Doucet. 
Jerry Kovacs
Jamie Kwong - former Quartier Vanier Merchants Association executive director. Endorsed by former Liberal MP Bryon Wilfert and former city councillor Bob Monette
Maurice Lamirande - Former school trustee for Conseil des écoles catholiques du Centre-Est.
Patrick Mayangi
Oriana Ngabirano - Reputation manager and public relations specialist
Chris Penton
Sheila Perry - Teacher, president of the Federation of Community Associations of Ottawa and President of the Ottawa Council of Women. Past President of the Overbrook Community Association. Endorsed by city councillor Jeff Leiper and former city councillor Marianne Wilkinson.
Penny Thompson - President of the Manor Park Community Association. Endorsed by former Liberal MPP Madeleine Meilleur and former city councillor Peter D. Clark.

Results

2022 Ottawa municipal election

References

External links
 Map of Rideau-Rockcliffe Ward

Ottawa wards